The 2009 AFL season was the Adelaide Football Club's 19th season in the Australian Football League (AFL).

The captain for this season was Simon Goodwin, and the leadership group was Tyson Edwards, Brett Burton, Ben Rutten, Nathan van Berlo, Michael Doughty and Scott Stevens.

Playing list
Statistics are correct as of start of 2009 season.
Flags represent place of birth.

Player changes for 2009

In

Out

NAB Cup
The despite an opening round loss to Geelong, the 2009 NAB Cup was not a total loss; Trent Hentschel made his return after 2 years off with a knee injury.
The Crows lost to the Geelong Cats by 35 points, 1.17.8 (119) - 2.9.12 (84).

Home and away season

(In the table below, green rows are wins, red rows are losses. In the Score column Adelaide scores are always shown first.)

All times are adjusted to Australian Central Standard Time.

Round 1

Round 2

Round 3 (Easter)

Round 4

Round 5 (ANZAC Day)

Round 6

Round 7

Round 8

Round 9 (Indigenous Round)

Round 10

Round 11 (Women's Round)

Round 12 (Split Round)

Round 13

Round 14

Round 15

Round 16

Round 17 (Rivalry Round)

Round 18

Round 19

Round 20 (Green Round)

Round 21

Round 22

Finals

Week one

Week two

Statistics

Team

Individual

Ladder

See also
Adelaide Crows 2009 Playing List

References

Adelaide Football Club seasons
2009 Australian Football League season